The 2012 Valparaiso Crusaders football team represented Valparaiso University in the 2012 NCAA Division I FCS football season. They were led by third-year head coach Dale Carlson and played their home games at Brown Field. They are a member of the Pioneer Football League. They finished the season 1–10, 1–7 in PFL play to finish in ninth place.

Schedule

Source: Schedule

Awards
 #22 Alex Grask S JR: Team's Most Valuable Player, Academic All PFL
 #49 Jake Hutson RB RSFR: Team's Offensive Player of the Year, PFL Offensive Freshman of the Year (Coaches, All PFL Honorable Mention (Coaches), PFL Freshman of the Year (College Sports Madness, All PFL 2nd Team (College Sports Madness)
 #88 Greg Wood P SR: Team's Special Team Player of the Year, All PFL 1st Team ( Coaches), All PFL 1st Team (College Sports Madness)
 #71 Sam Manternach OL FR: Team's Offensive Rookie of the Year
 #60 John Guilford DL FR: Team's Defensive Rookie of the Year, All PFL Honorable Mention
 #3 Erik Slenk WR SR: Crusader Special Team Effort Award
 #89 Austin Etzler WR FR: Offensive Scout Team Player of the Year
 #36 Tevin Johnson LB FR: Defensive Scout Team Player of the Year
 #83 Mike Gerton TE SR: Richard P. Koenig Award
 #38 Chris Howard DL RSSR: Joe Sever Trophy
 #75 Stuart Barkley OL SO: All PFL Honorable Mention (Coaches, Academic All PFL
 #35 Cody Gokan LB RSSR: All PFL Honorable Mention (Coaches)
 #24 Pat Derbak LB JR: All PFL Honorable Mention (Coaches, All PFL 3rd Team (College Sports Madness)
 #57 Bill Bodzianowski OL RSJR: All PFL 3rd Team (College Sports Madness)
 #70 Matt Scroll OL SR: Academic All PFL

References

Valparaiso
Valparaiso Beacons football seasons
Valparaiso Crusaders football